WTAR (850 AM) is a commercial radio station licensed to Norfolk, Virginia, and serving the Hampton Roads (Norfolk-Virginia Beach-Newport News) radio market.  WTAR is owned and operated by Sinclair Telecable, Inc. It broadcasts an adult album alternative format as "96.5 The Coast".

Until September 1, 2022 the station aired a sports radio format, carrying the Fox Sports Radio Network most of the day, with a local afternoon drive time show.  The syndicated Dan Patrick Show was heard in late mornings.  WTAR was part of the Washington Commanders Radio Network.

WTAR's studios and offices are on Waterside Drive in Norfolk.  The transmitter is off Track Lane in Smithfield, Virginia.  WTAR runs at 50,000 watts by day, the highest power permitted by the Federal Communications Commission for commercial AM stations.  At night, to reduce interference to other stations on AM 850, mainly Class A KOA in Denver, Colorado, WTAR reduces power to 25,000 watts.  It uses a directional antenna at all times.  WTAR programming is also heard on HD Radio over 106.1 WUSH-HD2 and on FM translator station W243DJ at 96.5 MHz in Norfolk and W243EK at 96.5 MHz in Hampton.

History
On September 21, 1923, WTAR signed on the air at 780 kilocycles with 15 watts of power.  It was the first radio station to go on the air in Virginia.  On July 6, 1934, WTAR became an affiliate of the NBC Red Network after dropping the CBS Radio Network.  At that time, the station was owned and operated by the parent company of the Norfolk Ledger-Star and The Virginian-Pilot.

By the late 1930s, WTAR got a power boost to 5,000 watts by day, 1,000 watts at night.  In the 1940s, the nighttime power was increased to match the daytime power, 5,000 watts.

WTAR added an FM counterpart in 1947, WTAR-FM (97.3), which mostly simulcast the AM station.  However, few people owned FM radios at that time, and WTAR gave up its FM license a couple of years later.  The 97.3 frequency returned to the air in the mid-1950s as WGH-FM.

In 1950, WTAR signed on a TV station, WTAR-TV (Channel 4, now WTKR on channel 3).  Because WTAR was an NBC affiliate, the TV station primarily carried NBC-TV programs.  As the first TV station in the Norfolk area, it also ran some shows from CBS, ABC and the DuMont Television Network.  Within a year of the TV station's debut, both the TV and radio facilities moved into a new broadcasting center at 720 Boush Street.

In 1961, WTAR management decided to return to FM broadcasting, and signed on a new WTAR-FM, this time at 95.7 MHz (now WVKL).  WTAR-FM aired automated beautiful music, separate from the AM station, which had a full service format of middle of the road music, adult contemporary, news, sports and talk.

By 1986 or 1987, WTAR switched their full-service format to an oldies format and became an affiliate of CBS Radio News.  In the early 1990s, the station stopped playing music and became a news/talk station, adding an affiliation with CNN as well as CBS Radio.  Around the same time, rival talk station WNIS got a big boost in power, going to 50,000 watts by day, 25,000 watts at night.  Eventually, both stations would become co-owned, with Sinclair acquiring AM 850 in June 1997.

The following month, on July 15, WTAR and its new sister station, WNIS, switched facilities.  WNIS moved to AM 790, while WTAR took over the 850 kHz spot on the dial.  The move gave WTAR the stronger signal. It now provides at least secondary coverage to most of southeastern Virginia, as far as Richmond. At night, it reduces power to protect KOA in Denver, Colorado, concentrating the signal in Norfolk, Virginia Beach, Hampton and Newport News.

WTAR flipped from talk radio to an all-sports format on February 5, 2006.   On September 15, 2017, WTAR began simulcasting on WUSH-HD2 and FM translator station W243DJ at 96.5 MHz in Norfolk.  The move allows WTAR listeners to hear the station on either AM or FM, although the FM translator signal is limited to Norfolk and surrounding communities due to its low power of 120 watts. The station also signed on another low-powered FM translator, W243EK in Hampton (on the same frequency of W243DJ), to improve its nighttime signal on the Lower Peninsula and the HRBT's AM/FM rebroadcast system.

On September 1, 2022 WTAR dropped its sports format and began stunting towards a new format with a loop of Justin Timberlake's "SexyBack" (as well as construction sound effects). However, on September 3, WTAR broke from the stunt to air a University of Virginia football game against Richmond. The 96.5 translators remained on the stunt during that time. On September 6, WTAR and its translators flipped to hot adult contemporary, branded as "96.5 Lucy FM", modeled after its sister station in Austin, Texas. The 850 AM signal continues to break away from Lucy FM programming for the University of Virginia broadcasts. 

On March 20, 2023 WTAR changed their format from hot adult contemporary to adult album alternative, branded as "96.5 The Coast".

Translators

See also
WRAP (Norfolk)

Previous logo

References

External links

1952 establishments in Virginia
Radio stations established in 1952
TAR
TAR